Palea may refer to:

 Palea (botany), part of the flower structure in some plants
 Palea (turtle), a genus of turtles in the family Trionychidae
 San Antonio de Palé, a town in Equatorial Guinea
 Palea (literature), old Russian work of apocryphal content